This is a list of drama anime television series, films, OVAs and ONAs.

References

Drama